Scream is the sixth studio album by Danish hard rock/heavy metal band Pretty Maids. The album was released in Japan on 13 October 1994 and in Denmark on 23 January 1995 by Epic Records.

Track listing

Personnel
Ronnie Atkins – songwriting, arrangement, vocals
Ken Hammer – songwriting, arrangement, guitar
Michael Fast – drums
Kenn Jackson – bass guitar
Alan Owen – keyboards
Dominic Gale – piano
Flemming Rasmussen – producer, engineer, mixer
Henrik Vindeby – engineer
Knud Lindhard – engineer, additional backing vocals

References

External links
Pretty Maids website

1994 albums
Pretty Maids albums
Albums produced by Flemming Rasmussen
Massacre Records albums